Alexandria Loy Hess (born July 19, 1996) is an American professional soccer player who plays as a forward for MSV Duisburg of the German Frauen-Bundesliga.

College career 
Hess played for Missouri Tigers women's soccer team from 2014 to 2017.

Club career 
In October 2021, Hess signed for MSV Duisburg.

References

External links 
 
 Missouri profile

1996 births
Living people
American women's soccer players
Kansas City Current players
MSV Duisburg (women) players
American expatriate women's soccer players
Expatriate women's footballers in Germany
Women's association football forwards
Missouri Tigers women's soccer players
National Women's Soccer League players